Fabrício Melo may refer to:

 Fabrício Ramos Melo (born 1986), Brazilian professional football (soccer) player
 Fab Melo (1990–2017), Brazilian professional basketball player